Shimakawa (written: 島川 lit. "island river") is a Japanese surname. Notable people with the surname include:

, Japanese World War II flying ace
, Japanese footballer

Japanese-language surnames